Meru Wind Power Station, also Meru Wind Farm, is a 400MW wind-powered power station, under construction in Kenya.

Location
The power station is located in northwestern Meru County, near the Meru County–Isiolo County border, south of Isiolo Airport. The approximate coordinates of the power station are 0°19'47.0"N, 37°35'30.0"E (Latitude:0°19'47.0"N; Longitude:37°35'30.0"E).

Overview
As part of efforts to diversify the national electricity sources, the government of Kenya plans to construct a 400 megawatt wind power station in Meru County. Kenya Electricity Generating Company, the government-controlled power generator will own and operate the power station. The first phase of this power station with generation capacity of 100MW was expected to come online in 2017, but delayed due to land disputes. An 80 MW combined wind, solar and battery project began construction in 2020.

Development partners
The project's first phase with capacity of 100 megawatts will cost approximately US$270 million (KSh26.4 billion), borrowed from France’s Development Agency (AfD) and Germany’s Development Bank (KfW).

See also

 List of power stations in Kenya
 Wind power in Kenya

References

External links
 KenGen
 Ministry of Energy and Petroleum (Kenya)
 Energy Regulation Commission (Kenya)
 Kenya Power
 Meru strikes Sh20b deal for wind power generation

Wind farms in Kenya
Meru County
Buildings and structures in Meru County